The Guanujo stubfoot toad (Atelopus guanujo), known in Spanish as puca sapo, is a species of toads in the family Bufonidae endemic to Ecuador. Its natural habitats are subtropical or tropical moist montane forests and rivers. It is threatened by habitat loss.

References

Atelopus
Amphibians of Ecuador
Amphibians of the Andes
Amphibians described in 2002
Taxonomy articles created by Polbot